Gaimardia is a genus of plants in the Restionaceae family. It has a disjunct distribution in New Zealand, New Guinea, Tasmania and extreme southern South America. 

APG III system classifies this genus in the Centrolepidaceae family.

Species
Four species are recognised:
Gaimardia amblyphylla W.M.Curtis – Tasmania
Gaimardia australis Gaudich. – Falkland Islands, Magellan Strait region in Chile + Argentina
Gaimardia fitzgeraldii F.Muell. & Rodw. – Tasmania
Gaimardia setacea Hook.f. –- New Guinea, Tasmania, New Zealand South Island

References

Poales genera
Restionaceae